Marek Hecl (born 30 December 1997) is a Slovak professional ice hockey player. He is currently playing for the HKM Zvolen of the Slovak Extraliga.

Career statistics

Regular season and playoffs

References

External links

 

1997 births
Living people
Slovak ice hockey right wingers
Sportspeople from Trenčín
HC Slovan Bratislava players
HK Dukla Trenčín players
HC Olomouc players
HKM Zvolen players
HC Dynamo Pardubice players
HC Vrchlabí players
Slovak expatriate ice hockey players in the Czech Republic
Slovak expatriate ice hockey players in Sweden